Luckes is a surname. It may be a variant of Lucas or Lucks.

Luckes as a surname may refer to:
David Luckes (born 1968), a former field hockey goalkeeper from England
Eva Luckes (1854–1919), Matron of the London Hospital
Wally Luckes (1901–1982), English cricketer

See also
Lucas (surname)
Lucks (disambiguation)